Raul Hellberg (15 December 1900 – 30 October 1985) was a Finnish racing cyclist. He won the Finnish national road race title eight times between 1923 and 1931. He also competed in the men's individual road race at the 1928 Summer Olympics.

References

External links
 

1900 births
1985 deaths
Finnish male cyclists
People from Porvoo
Olympic cyclists of Finland
Cyclists at the 1928 Summer Olympics
Sportspeople from Uusimaa